This is a list of the described species of the harvestman family Phalangodidae. The data is taken from Joel Hallan's Biology Catalog.

 Ausobskya Martens, 1972 — Greece
 Ausobskya athos Martens, 1972
 Ausobskya brevipes Thaler, 1996
 Ausobskya hauseri Silhavý, 1976
 Ausobskya mahnerti Silhavý, 1976

 Banksula Roewer, 1949 — California
 Banksula californica (Banks, 1900)
 Banksula galilei Briggs, 1974
 Banksula grahami Briggs, 1974
 Banksula grubbsi Briggs & Ubick, 1981
 Banksula incredula Ubick & Briggs, 2002
 Banksula martinorum Briggs & Ubick, 1981
 Banksula melones Briggs, 1974
 Banksula rudolphi Briggs & Ubick, 1981
 Banksula tuolumne Briggs, 1974
 Banksula tutankhamen Ubick & Briggs, 2002

 Bishopella Roewer, 1927
 Bishopella jonesi Goodnight & Goodnight, 1942 — Alabama
 Bishopella laciniosa (Crosby & Bishop, 1924) — southeastern US

 Calicina Ubick & Briggs, 1989 — California
 Calicina arida Ubick & Briggs, 1989
 Calicina basalta Ubick & Briggs, 1989
 Calicina breva (Briggs, 1968)
 Calicina cloughensis (Briggs & Hom, 1967)
 Calicina conifera Ubick & Briggs, 1989
 Calicina digita (Briggs & Hom, 1967)
 Calicina diminua Ubick & Briggs, 1989
 Calicina dimorphica Ubick & Briggs, 1989
 Calicina ensata (Briggs, 1968)
 Calicina galena Ubick & Briggs, 1989
 Calicina kaweahensis (Briggs & Hom, 1966)
 Calicina keenea (Briggs, 1968)
 Calicina macula (Briggs, 1968)
 Calicina mariposa (Briggs, 1968)
 Calicina mesaensis Ubick & Briggs, 1989
 Calicina minor (Briggs & Hom, 1966)
 Calicina morroensis (Briggs, 1968)
 Calicina palapraeputia (Briggs, 1968)
 Calicina piedra (Briggs, 1968)
 Calicina polina (Briggs, 1968)
 Calicina sequoia (Briggs & Hom, 1966)
 Calicina serpentinea (Briggs & Hom, 1966)
 Calicina sierra (Briggs & Hom, 1967)
 Calicina topanga (Briggs, 1968)
 Calicina yosemitensis (Briggs, 1968)

 Crosbyella Roewer, 1927
 Crosbyella distincta Goodnight & Goodnight, 1942 — Arkansas
 Crosbyella montana Goodnight & Goodnight, 1942 — Alabama
 Crosbyella roeweri Goodnight & Goodnight, 1942 — Arkansas
 Crosbyella spinturnix (Crosby & Bishop, 1924) — southeastern US
 Crosbyella tuberculata Goodnight & Goodnight, 1942 — Alabama

 Glennhuntia Shear, 2001 (misplaced?)
 Glennhuntia glennhunti Shear, 2001 — western Australia

 Guerrobunus Goodnight & Goodnight, 1945 — Mexico (misplaced?)
 Guerrobunus arganoi (Silhavý, 1974)
 Guerrobunus minutus Goodnight & Goodnight, 1945
 Guerrobunus vallensis Vázquez & Cokendolpher, 1997

 Haasus Roewer, 1949
 Haasus judaeus Roewer, 1949 — Israel

 Lola Kratochvíl, 1937
 Lola insularis Kratochvíl, 1937 — Croatia

 Maiorerus Rambla, 1993
 Maiorerus randoi Rambla, 1993 — Canary Islands, Spain

 Microcina Briggs & Ubick, 1989 — California
 Microcina edgewoodensis Briggs & Ubick, 1989
 Microcina homi Briggs & Ubick, 1989
 Microcina jungi Briggs & Ubick, 1989
 Microcina leei Briggs & Ubick, 1989
 Microcina lumi Briggs & Ubick, 1989
 Microcina tiburona (Briggs & Hom, 1966)

 Paralola Kratochvíl, Balat & Pelikan, 1958
 Paralola buresi Kratochvíl, Balat & Pelikan, 1958 — Bulgaria

 Phalangodes Tellkampf, 1844
 Phalangodes armata Tellkampf, 1844 — Kentucky
 Phalangodes flavipes (Banks, 1908) — Cuba (misplaced?)

 Phalangomma Roewer, 1949
 Phalangomma virginicum Roewer, 1949 — Virginia

 Proscotolemon Roewer, 1916 — Japan
 Proscotolemon sauteri Roewer, 1916
 Proscotolemon sauteri sauteri Roewer, 1916
 Proscotolemon sauteri lateens Suzuki, 1973

 Ptychosoma Sørensen, 1873
 Ptychosoma catalonicum Kraus, 1961 — Spain
 Ptychosoma vitellinum Sørensen, 1873 — Italy, North Africa

 Scotolemon Lucas, 1860
 Scotolemon balearicus Rambla, 1977 — Balearic Islands, Spain
 Scotolemon claviger (Simon, 1879) — France
 Scotolemon doriae Pavesi, 1878 — France, Croatia, Sicily
 Scotolemon espanoli Rambla, 1973 — Spain
 Scotolemon jaqueti Roewer, 1912 — Hungary, Romania
 Scotolemon krausi Rambla, 1972 — Spain
 Scotolemon lespesi Lucas, 1860 — Portugal, France
 Scotolemon lucasi Simon, 1872 — France
 Scotolemon navaricus Simon, 1879 — Pyrenees
 Scotolemon piochardi Simon, 1892 — Spain
 Scotolemon reclinatus Roewer, 1935 — Spain
 Scotolemon roeweri Kraus, 1961 — Spain
 Scotolemon terricola Simon, 1872 — Corsica, Algeria

 Sitalcina Banks, 1911 — California
 Sitalcina borregoensis Briggs, 1968
 Sitalcina californica (Banks, 1893)
 Sitalcina cockerelli Goodnight & Goodnight, 1942
 Sitalcina flava Briggs, 1968
 Sitalcina flava flava T. S. Briggs, 1968
 Sitalcina flava chalona Briggs, 1968
 Sitalcina granita Briggs, 1968
 Sitalcina lobata Goodnight & Goodnight, 1942
 Sitalcina madera Briggs, 1968
 Sitalcina scopula Briggs, 1968
 Sitalcina sura Briggs, 1968

 Texella Goodnight & Goodnight, 1942
 Texella bifurcata (Briggs, 1968) — California, Oregon
 Texella bilobata Ubick & Briggs, 1992 — Texas
 Texella brevidenta Ubick & Briggs, 1992 — Texas
 Texella brevistyla Ubick & Briggs, 1992 — Texas
 Texella cokendolpheri Ubick & Briggs, 1992 — Texas
 Texella deserticola Ubick & Briggs, 1992 — California
 Texella dimopercula Ubick & Briggs, 2004 — Texas
 Texella diplospina Ubick & Briggs, 1992 — Texas
 Texella elliotti Ubick & Briggs, 2004 — Texas
 Texella fendi Ubick & Briggs, 1992 — Texas
 Texella grubbsi Ubick & Briggs, 1992 — Texas
 Texella hardeni Ubick & Briggs, 1992 — Texas
 Texella hartae Ubick & Briggs, 2004 — Texas
 Texella hilgerensis Ubick & Briggs, 2004 — Texas
 Texella homi Ubick & Briggs, 1992 — Texas
 Texella jungi Ubick & Briggs, 1992 — Texas
 Texella kokoweef Ubick & Briggs, 1992 — California
 Texella longistyla Ubick & Briggs, 1992 — Texas,
 Texella mulaiki Goodnight & Goodnight, 1942 — Texas
 Texella reddelli Goodnight & Goodnight, 1967 — Texas
 Texella renkesae Ubick & Briggs, 1992 — Texas
 Texella reyesi Ubick & Briggs, 1992 — Texas
 Texella shoshone Ubick & Briggs, 1992 — California
 Texella spinoperca Ubick & Briggs, 1992 — Texas
 Texella tuberculata Ubick & Briggs, 2004 — Texas
 Texella welbourni Ubick & Briggs, 1992 — New Mexico
 Texella whitei Ubick & Briggs, 2004 — Texas
 Texella youngensis Ubick & Briggs, 2004 — Texas

 Tolus Goodnight & Goodnight, 1942
 Tolus appalachius Goodnight & Goodnight, 1942 — Tennessee

 Undulus Goodnight & Goodnight, 1942
 Undulus formosus Goodnight & Goodnight, 1942 — Alabama

 Wespus Goodnight & Goodnight, 1942
 Wespus arkansasensis Goodnight & Goodnight, 1942 — Arkansas

References
 Joel Hallan's Biology Catalog: Phalangodidae

Phalangodidae
Phalangodidae